Liberibacter is a genus of Gram-negative bacteria in the Rhizobiaceae family. Detection of the liberibacteria is based on PCR amplification of their 16S rRNA gene with specific primers. Members of the genus are plant pathogens mostly transmitted by psyllids. The genus was originally spelled Liberobacter.

Most importantly, Liberibacter is a causative agent of Huanglongbing disease (HLB) also known as citrus greening disease. Liberibacter is transmitted by two insects from Psyllidae family – Diaphorina citri in Asia, Brazil and Florida, and Trioza erytreae in Africa. The Asian HLB strain, "Candidatus Liberibacter asiaticus" is more heat tolerant, while the African strain, Candidatus Liberibacter africanus is asymptomatic at temperatures above 30 °C. Species of Liberibacter, infecting solanaceous plants has been identified and it was carried by another psyllid, a potato pest Bactericera cockerelli.

Pathogenicty 
Liberibacter bacteria are carried in the hemolymph and salivary glands of psyllids. Since psyllids feed on sap, this provides bacteria the entry to phloem of the plant. They induce significant metabolic and regulatory changes that damage the plants transport system and affects plants defense systems. These impairments have downstream negative effects on citrus microbiome of the infected plants.

Since Liberibacter cannot be cultivated outside of its vector or host, genetics, bacteria-vector and bacteria-plant interaction have not yet been thoroughly explored. Factors important for adaption and colonization or possible coevolution are not yet understood. Liberibacter activates salicylic acid pathway in host, likely due to recognition of extracellular molecules such as lipopolyscacharides or flagella. Pathogen in turn likely mitigates the effects, because it encodes SA hydroxylase, that degrades salicylic acid. Liberibacteria were shown to affect the spread of vector, by influencing the flight frequencies and sexual attraction of D. citri. On the other hand, infection with Liberibacter causes higher mortality of D. citri adults, but not nymphs. Liberibacter is a part of the psyllid microbiota and co-existence with other bacteria likely has impact on the overall fitness of the insect, as well as outcome of the disease.

Treatment 
Primary strategy for HLB disease management is a vector control. Antimicrobial treatment can suppress Liberibacter species, however usage of broad spectrum antibiotics is inadvisable due to adverse environmental effects. Alternative treatments, such as heat therapy, i.e., incubation of plant at temperatures above 40 °C for several days, show varying effects. Another suggested alternatives include the use of compounds that alleviate disease symptoms and boost plants defense systems or reinforcing natural citrus microbiota in order to compete with Liberibacter species.
 Early detection of HLB positive trees and removal from the groves, and extensive control of psyllids are the crucial HLB management strategies.

Species
Named species include:
 "Candidatus Liberibacter africanus" corrig. Jagoueix et al. 1994 originated in Africa and is a causal agent of citrus greening disease, also known as huanglongbing, and vectored by the African citrus psyllid Trioza erytreae.
 "Candidatus Liberibacter americanus" Teixeira et al. 2005 is a novel species from Brazil described in 2005 and associated with huanglongbing and vectored by the Asian citrus psyllid Diaphorina citri.
 "Candidatus Liberibacter asiaticus" corrig. Jagoueix et al. 1994 originated in Asia and is a causal agent of huanglongbing, vectored by the Asian citrus psyllid D. citri.
 "Candidatus Liberibacter brunswickensis" Morris et al. 2017 associated with the psyllid Acizzia solanicola on eggplant in Australia.
 Liberibacter crescens Fagen et al. 2014 was isolated from papaya growing in Puerto Rico.
 "Candidatus Liberibacter europaeus" Raddadi et al. 2011 is a novel species described in 2010, found in pear trees, where it seems to cause no symptoms and is vectored by the psyllid, Cacopsylla pyri.
 "Candidatus Liberibacter solanacearum" Liefting et al. 2009 is a causal agent of zebra chip disease in potatoes and vectored by the potato tomato psyllid Bactericera cockerelli. There are five haplotypes described within this species, designated LsoA and LsoB (from solanaceous plants in North America), and LsoC, LsoD, and LsoE (from carrots and celery in Europe).
 LsoA is also described as a species as "Candidatus Liberibacter psyllidaureus" corrig. Hansen et al. 2008 or the misspelling Ca. L. psyllaurous. It is now considered synonymous as the 16S rRNA genes are identical. In addition to being a plant pathogen, LsoA also serves as an endosymbiont for the insect vector, by modifying tomato defenses in favor of itself and its vector.

References

Further reading

External links 
 g__Liberibacter in GTDB

Bacterial plant pathogens and diseases
Potato diseases
Rhizobiaceae